Under Western Skies is a 1926 American silent Western film directed by Edward Sedgwick and starring Norman Kerry, Anne Cornwall, and Ward Crane.

Cast

Production
The film uses footage taken for several events taken at the Pendleton Round-Up in Pendleton, Oregon.

Preservation
With no prints of Under Western Skies located in any film archives, it is a lost film.

References

Bibliography
 
 Munden, Kenneth White (1997). The American Film Institute Catalog of Motion Pictures Produced in the United States, Part 1. University of California Press.

External links
 

1926 films
1926 Western (genre) films
1920s English-language films
Universal Pictures films
Films directed by Edward Sedgwick
American black-and-white films
Silent American Western (genre) films
1920s American films